Celta de Vigo contested La Liga, Copa del Rey and UEFA Champions League in the 2003–04 season. The side reached the last 16 of the Champions League in their competition debut, going out to Arsenal, but at the same time the league form suffered and Celta dropped beneath the relegation zone, from which the team could not recover, and having finished in the top half of the standings for the better part of a decade, Celta found themselves in Segunda División, which rendered several key players leaving.

Three Managers in Europe Four Years Since Atletico Madrid in 2000. was relegated

Squad
Squad at end of season

Left club during season

Results summary

La Liga

Competitions

La Liga

League table

Matches

Copa del Rey

Round of 32

Round of 16

Round of 8

Quarter-finals

Champions League

Qualifying round

Group stage

Round of 16

Top scorers

La Liga
  Savo Milošević 14
  Alexandr Mostovoi 6
  Jesuli 6
  Peter Luccin 5

Copa del Rey
  Vagner 3
  Jandro 2
  Jesuli 2

Champions League
  Alexandr Mostovoi 2
  Jandro 2
  Edu 2
  José Ignacio 2

References

RC Celta de Vigo seasons
Celta